Mandi is a village in the Muzaffarnagar district of Uttar Pradesh, India. It is located about 200 km northeast of Delhi. It is notable for the discovery and looting of an ancient treasure trove by villagers in June 2000. The treasure is believed to have been from the Indus Valley civilisation period. It is known as "Mandi treasure" or "Mandy hoard".

2000 treasure discovery 
Till 2000, a mound of mud used to exist on the border of the village. It was located on the 500 sq. m. property of Anil Kumar, who intended to level the land for cultivating sugarcane. He told the other villagers that they could remove the mud from the mound for their own use. In June 2000, three women villagers uncovered a copper urn containing gold ornaments, while scraping mud from the mound. On that day, Anil Kumar had gone out of the village to visit a sick relative. The three women started fighting over the treasure. The noise attracted the family of a landless labourer, who snatched the urn from the women. By the evening, other villagers were also seeking the treasure. A husband-wife duo uncovered another pottery urn containing and estimated 40 kg of bracelets and necklaces. Next, Anil Kumar's cousin and local strongman Sudhir came to the site with eight men, and uncovered more treasure. According to Anil Kumar's mother, who had fled to an adjacent sugarcane field after Sudhir pulled a gun on her, the men discovered around 60 kg of jewellery and three copper urns, also presumably filled with jewellery. Subsequently, the local transport chief and bus driver dug up an estimated 40 kg of gold. By the night, most of the 4,000 villagers had crowded around the plot, digging and fighting for treasure.

The police arrived at around 10 pm. According to a villager Mahinder Singh, the police asked his son to Somi Singh to continue the digging. Somi Singh allegedly unearthed 35 kg of gold pieces and a golden scabbard of a dagger, but was later arrested on the frivolous charges. According to the official records, only 10 kg of treasure was recovered by the district authorities. The authorities estimate that the villagers had uncovered around 500 kg of treasure. They offered the villagers double the market price for the ornaments. However, most of the treasure was sold to the local traders, who melted it.

According to the experts from ASI and the Uttar Pradesh Department of Archaeology (DoA), the jewelry belonged to the Late Harappan period. It resembled the jewelry found at Indus Valley civilization (IVC) sites such as Harappa, Mohenjo-daro, Lothal, Rakhigarhi and Dholavira in India.

List of artifacts recovered 
The list of artifacts recovered by the district authorities is as follows:

See also
 Indus Valley civilization
 List of Indus Valley Civilization sites
 List of inventions and discoveries of the Indus Valley Civilization
 Hydraulic engineering of the Indus Valley Civilization

References

Villages in Muzaffarnagar district
Treasure troves of India
Indus Valley civilisation sites